Munda Hi Chahida is a 2019 Indian Punjabi-language family drama film directed by Santosh Subhash Thite and Deepak Thaper. Co-produced by Neeru Bajwa Entertainment and Shri Narotam Ji Films; it stars Harish Verma and Rubina Bajwa in lead roles. The film was released worldwide on 12 July 2019.

Cast 

 Harish Verma as Dharmender
 Rubina Bajwa as Rani
 Jatinder Kaur as Dadi
 Pawan Johal as sister
Rupinder Rupi as Bhua

Soundtrack 

Soundtrack of the film is composed by Gurmeet Singh, Gurmoh and Gurcharan Singh while background score is composed by Sandeep Saxena. Lyrics were penned by Harmanjeet, Harinder Kaur and Kaptaan.

Release and marketing 

The film was originally scheduled to be released on 5 July 2019 but was later postponed to 12 July 2019. The film is distributed by Omjee Star Studios in India and Rhythm Boyz Entertainment in overseas. First look poster of the film was released on 14 June 2019 with Harish Verma and Rubina Bajwa in it. Official trailer of the film was released on 18 June 2019 on YouTube by Jass Records.

References 

Punjabi-language Indian films
Indian pregnancy films